892 Naval Air Squadron  (892 NAS) was a  carrier-based fighter squadron of the British Royal Navy's Fleet Air Arm. It was formed in 1943, flying Grumman Martlets, and was the only operational Fleet Air Arm squadron to fly the McDonnell Douglas Phantom FG.1.

History
892 Naval Air Squadron was first formed on 15 July 1942 at Naval Air Station Norfolk, Virginia as a single-seat fighter squadron. It was equipped with six Grumman Martlet IV fighters when it embarked on the newly completed escort aircraft carrier  for passage across the Atlantic on 21 December 1942. In February 1943, the squadron embarked aboard , which supported convoys in the North Atlantic. The squadron's strength was reduced to three Martlets in June 1943, and it was disbanded on 11 August 1943, passing its aircraft to 819 Naval Air Squadron.

892 Squadron reformed on 1 April 1945 at RNAS Eglinton (now City of Derry Airport) in Northern Ireland as a night fighter squadron, equipped with Grumman Hellcat II NFs, being the first Fleet Air Arm squadron to be equipped with the night fighter version of the Hellcat. The squadron moved to Drem in Scotland for training in its night fighter duties in July 1945, and in December 1945 embarked on the carrier . Ocean had been fitted out during construction as a dedicated nightfighter carrier, and was sent to the Mediterranean carrying 892 Squadron's Hellcats and 1792 Squadron's Fairey Fireflys, in order to evaluate night carrier operations and compare the single-seat Hellcat against the two-seat Firefly as a night fighter. The trials continued into April 1946, showing that intensive night operations from aircraft carriers were practicable, and that the Firefly was more suitable for the Fleet Air Arm's short-term requirements for a night fighter. The squadron disbanded at Gosport on 19 April 1946.

The squadron recommissioned at Yeovolton on 4 July 1955, as an all-weather fighter squadron equipped with the de Havilland Sea Venom. In January 1956, it embarked aboard  for a deployment to the Mediterranean and Far East, the carrier returning to Britain in May 1956. In July 1956, the squadron flew out to Malta to join the carrier , and from 31 October took part in Operation Musketeer, the Anglo-French attack on the Suez Canal, attacking ground targets and providing air cover for the invasion forces. The squadron was disbanded again on 26 December 1956, being incorporated into 893 Naval Air Squadron. 

On 1 July 1959 892 Squadron was reformed at Yeovilton from 700Y Squadron with de Havilland Sea Vixen all-weather fighters, being the first operational fighter squadron to use the Sea Vixen. Eight of the squadron's 12 Sea Vixens deployed aboard  in March 1960, while the remaining flight of four Sea Vixens were used to test the Firestreak air-to-air missiles that were the Sea Vixen's primary armament. The two flights rejoined aboard Ark Royal in August 1960, before disembarking on 30 September. In October 1960, the squadron deployed aboard , which sailed for the Far East in January, returning to Britain in December that year, while from May 1962 to October 1963, the squadron served aboard  on another deployment to the Far East. In December 1963, the squadron was embarked aboard  for a highly active deployment to the Middle and Far East. In April, the squadron's Sea Vixens carried out air strikes against rebelling tribesmen in the Radfan Campaign, while later in the year the squadron flew air defence and surface search patrols around southern Malaysia as Centaur took part in the Indonesia–Malaysia confrontation. 

The squadron returned to Yeovilton in July 1965 and re-equipped with the improved FAW2 version of the Sea Vixen by the end of the year. In January 1967, the squadron sailed to the Far East aboard Hermes, returning to Britain and disembarking in February 1968. In 1968 the squadron provided the Fleet Air Arm's official air display team, known as Simon's Sircus [sic] aerobatic team, after the squadron's commanding officer, Lieutenant Commander Simon Idiens. It displayed at airshows throughout the summer of 1968 before disbanding on 4 October that year.

892 Naval Air Squadron was reformed on 31 March 1969, and was the Royal Navy’s only operational Phantom FG.1 unit (both 700P and 767 NAS were training squadrons).

In 1964 the Royal Navy had envisaged operating 143 Phantoms with a combined carrier fleet of HMS Ark Royal, HMS Eagle, and the new super-carrier CVA-01. However, these plans were significantly curtailed when the government's 1966 Defence White Paper cancelled the CVA-01 project in 1966, and, amid further defence cuts, only proceeded to refurbish Ark Royal and Eagle. As a result, the number of Phantoms planned to be operated was cut to 134 and then to 110. Eventually only 48 examples were ordered, which was enough for two squadrons of 12 aircraft each for Ark Royal and Eagle, and with additional aircraft for a training squadron (767 NAS) and reserves. However, as aircraft were beginning to be delivered during 1968 Eagle’s refit was cancelled and 20 aircraft were allocated to the RAF.

Against a backdrop of defence cuts 892 Squadron suspected that it would become the last fixed-wing squadron and poignantly adopted a large Ω symbol on a white diamond placed on a red fin flash as its squadron symbol.

Despite its (later to be proved unjustified) claim to being the last Royal Naval squadron to operate fixed wing fighters (Sea Harriers began equipping the Fleet Air Arm in April 1980), 892 gained worldwide exposure when one of their Phantoms won the Daily Mail Trans-Atlantic Air Race in May 1969. Lt Cdr Brian Davies, and Lt Cdr Peter Goddard set a record for flight time from New York to London of 4 hours 46 minutes and 57 seconds.

With HMS Ark Royal ready, Phantoms from 892 NAS were embarked and operations could begin, with additional aircraft from 767 using the carrier for practice. Shortly afterwards 767 NAS was disbanded with the personnel and equipment moving to the Phantom Training Flight (a Royal Navy unit), and based at RAF Leuchars, Fife, Scotland in 1972. 892 was also to move base from RNAS Yeovilton to RAF Leuchars in the same year.

Whilst disembarked from Ark Royal the squadron shared Fighter Ready Alert duties with both 23 Squadron (English Electric Lightning) and 43 Squadron of the RAF, who themselves had been equipped with the F4K Phantoms that became surplus when it was decided not to employ another Navy Phantom squadron in Eagle.

Throughout the 1970s the unit was involved in a variety of NATO and Royal Navy exercises. However, the complex maintenance of the Phantom was to consistently plague the aircraft, despite great efforts by crew and maintainers. These efforts were depicted in the BBC documentary Sailor.

With HMS Ark Royal due to pay off in December 1978 it was confirmed that there was to be no future for 892 Squadron. On 27 November 1978 XT870/012 became the last aircraft to be catapulted from a British aircraft carrier. 892 NAS was disbanded on 15 December 1978 and its Phantom FG.1s were transferred to No. 111 Squadron RAF at RAF Leuchars.

892 Squadron will be the second Naval squadron to operate the F-35, after 809 Squadron has been stood up in 2023.

Aircraft flown
Aircraft flown by 892 Naval Air Squadron include:

Grumman Martlet IV
Grumman Hellcat II NF
de Havilland Sea VenomFAW.21
de Havilland Sea VixenFAW.1
McDonnell Douglas Phantom FG.1
F-35 Future Service

References

External links
http://www.phantomf4k.org 892 Squadron on Phantom F4K, Fleet Air Arm, Royal Navy
http://www.seavixen.org 892 Squadron on SeaVixen, Royal Navy, Carrier Jet

800 series Fleet Air Arm squadrons
Military units and formations established in 1942
Military units and formations disestablished in 1978